Epic Rap Battles of History is a YouTube series created by Peter "Nice Peter" Shukoff and Lloyd "EpicLLOYD" Ahlquist. The first episode of the series "John Lennon vs. Bill O'Reilly" was released on September 26, 2010. All Season 1 episodes were uploaded to Shukoff's personal YouTube channel, Nice Peter. Following the show's popularity and success, Ahlquist and Shukoff partnered with Maker Studios, and created two channels devoted to the series. ERB hosts the finished episodes, and ERB2 features behind-the-scenes footage.

On September 26, 2010, "John Lennon vs. Bill O'Reilly", the first music video was released on Shukoff's channel, where the rest of the first season was released. Since the second season, ERB music videos have been distributed through its own YouTube channel. As of November 2020, it is the 363rd most subscribed channel on YouTube with over 14.8 million subscribers and over 3.8 billion total views. As of October 25, 2022, a total of 86 episodes have been released.

In 2013, the single "Barack Obama vs. Mitt Romney", was the first YouTube music video to achieve a gold certification from the Recording Industry Association of America (RIAA). "Darth Vader vs. Hitler" and "Einstein vs. Stephen Hawking" also achieved RIAA gold certification during 2013. "Dr. Seuss vs Shakespeare", "Master Chief vs Leonidas", "Steve Jobs vs Bill Gates" and "Justin Bieber vs Beethoven" were subsequently certified Gold in 2014. On June 4, 2015, "Mario Bros. vs Wright Bros.", "Mr T vs Mr Rogers" and "Abe Lincoln vs Chuck Norris" achieved RIAA gold certification. On January 29, 2016, "Darth Vader vs Adolf Hitler 2" was certified gold. 

ERBOH Season 1, the series' first album was released on a compact disc through DFTBA Records in December 2011, including all 15 tracks from the first season of the series, including 2 bonus live tracks. Epic Rap Battles of History Season 2 was digitally released on May 22, 2013 on iTunes through Maker Studios. Epic Rap Battles of History Season 3 was released in 2014 through the official ERB website's online shop.

Overview

Episodes 
Capitalization and punctuation irregularities in titles as posted to YouTube have been normalized in the following lists.

Season 1 (2010–2011) 
All first season videos were uploaded onto Shukoff's channel, Nice Peter.

Season 2 (2011–2013) 
From the second season onwards, the battles were moved to their own YouTube channel, ERB.

Season 3 (2013–2014)

Season 4 (2014–2015)

Bonus Battle (2015)

Season 5 (2016–2017)

Bonus Battle (2018)

Flash in the Pan Hip Hop Conflicts of Nowadays (2018–2019) 
Flash in the Pan Hip Hop Conflicts of Nowadays is a pseudo-spinoff of Epic Rap Battles, created without the complex visual effects and accents normally used for the original series. Instead, Shukoff and Alquist rap together in the same room, over one take. This approach was used for rap battle ideas that the two considered worthy of a rap battle, but not famous enough to demand a full production. "Ronald McDonald vs The Burger King" would later go on to earn a fully-produced rap battle in Season 6.

Season 6 (2019–2020)

Cancelled episode (2020)

Season 7 (2021–present) 

As a result of the COVID-19 pandemic, ERB chose to transition into a seventh season early rather than continuing Season 6.

Viewership 

Note: View counts are accurate estimations as of March 5, 2021

References 

Lists of episodes